Zadok Malka is a former Israeli footballer.

Honours
Israeli Championships
1984–85, 1988–89, 1990–91

References

1964 births
Living people
Israeli footballers
Maccabi Haifa F.C. players
Maccabi Jaffa F.C. players
Liga Leumit players
Footballers from Haifa
Israeli people of Moroccan-Jewish descent
Association football forwards
Association football midfielders